Alvania erentoezae is an extinct species of sea snail, a marine gastropod mollusk or micromollusk in the family Rissoidae.

Description
The shell is slender. The aperture is round.

Distribution
Western Taurids, Southwestern Turkey.

References

Rissoidae
Miocene gastropods
Gastropods described in 2006